General elections were held in Curaçao on 19 October 2012. Early elections for the Curaçao island council were necessary as the Cabinet-Schotte lost its majority in the Estates of Curaçao. The elections were the first of the Curaçao after obtaining the status of country within the Kingdom of the Netherlands upon the dissolution of the Netherlands Antilles in 2010. The election saw six parties obtain one or more of the 21 seats, with Sovereign People and  Movement for the Future of Curaçao both winning five.

Background
The Schotte-cabinet relied on a majority of 11 out of 21 seats in the Estates (the parties Movementu Futuro Korsou (MFK), Pueblo Soberano (PS) and Movishon Antia Nobo (MAN)). When Eugene Cleopa (MAN) and MFK parliamentary leader Dean Rozier decided to leave their fraction, and to stay in the Estates as an individual party, the Cabinet lost its majority. The move of Cleopa and Rozier was a result of problematic relationship with the Netherlands and charges of corruption and nepotism of the Scholte government.

Primary elections
All prospective parties that had no seats in the Estates prior to the election, needed in order to qualify for participation in the elections to obtain 743 support votes: 1% of the number of valid votes during the 2010 elections. The vote took place on 8 and 9 September 2012 amongst the parties.

Eight parties qualified to participated in the elections: Pueblo Soberano (PS), Partido Democraat (DP), Partido Alternativa Real (PAR), Partido MAN, Partido Nashonal di Pueblo (PNP), Frente Obrero Liberashon 30 di mei (FOL), Movementu Futuro Kòrsou (MFK) and Partido pa Adelanto i Inovashon Soshal (PAIS). The lists of these parties were approved by the Hoofdkiesraad.()

Opinion polls
In August and September 2012, opinion polls were conducted among the potential voters indicating they would vote and who already had decided what to vote. 

|-style="background:#E9E9E9;"
! align="left"|Parties
! 2010 elections% (Seats)
! August 2012 poll% (Seats)
! September 2012 poll% (Seats)
! October 2012 (seats)
|-
| align="left"|Partido Antiá Restrukturá (PAR)
| 30 (8)
| 34 (8)
| 16 (3)
| (4)
|-
| align="left"|Movementu Futuro Korsou (MFK)
| 21 (5)
| 27 (6)
| 26 (6)
| (5)
|-
| align="left"|Pueblo Soberano (PS)
| 19 (4)
| 20 (5)
| 26 (6)
| (4)
|-
| align="left"|Movishon Antia Nobo (MAN)
| 9 (2)
| 6 (1)
| 5 (1)
| (1)
|-
| align="left"|Partido Frente Obrero Liberashon 30 Di Mei (FOL)
| 7 (1)
| 2 (0)
| 3 (0)
| (1)
|-
| align="left"|Partido Nashonal di Pueblo (PNP)
| 6 (1)
| 4 (0)
| 1 (0)
| (1)
|-
| align="left"|Partido pa Adelanto I Inovashon Soshal (PAIS)
| 3 (0)
| 5 (1)
| 21 (5)
| (4)
|-
| align="left"|Democraat/Laboral(Parti Democraat Laboral)
| 5 (0)
| 2 (0)
| 2 (0)
| (1)
|-
| align="left"|Others
| 0 (0)
| 1 (0)
| 4 (0)
| (0)
|-
| align="left"|Source
| Election results
| University of Curaçao
| University of Curaçao
| Fundashon Pro Pueblo
|}

Results
116,857 people were eligible to vote by satisfying 3 main criteria residents of Curaçao of at least 18 years of age with Dutch citizenship. The elections were supervised by observers from Aruba, Sint Maarten, Trinidad and Tobago and the Dominican Republic. The final result is:

Aftermath
Based on these results, PS, MFK and MAN (the 2010 coalition parties) had a majority in the estates, and decided to form a government. The parties signed a declaration to that effect (termed the Zeelandia declaration), while acting governor Adele van der Pluijm-Vrede appointed Glenn Camelia as "informateur" to advise her on a suitable majority government. MFK pulled out of negotiations on 28 October, stating unfavorable comments of PS-leader Wiels on radio as the cause. A majority was formed based on PS, PAIS, PNP and Glenn Sulvaran (who had left PAR to become an independent member of parliament), which formed an interim cabinet led by Daniel Hodge.

The interim cabinet was succeeded by the cabinet-Asjes on 7 June 2013.

References

External links
 Electoral office

General election
Curaçao
Elections in Curaçao